Tim Jones (born May 15, 1998) is an American football wide receiver for the Jacksonville Jaguars of the National Football League (NFL). He played college football at Southern Miss.

Early years
Jones attended Biloxi High School in Biloxi, Mississippi. A 3-star recruit, he committed to Southern Mississippi to play college football in 2016. He chose Southern Mississippi over Louisiana, Memphis, and Texas-San Antonio.

College career
Jones played at Southern Mississippi from 2017 to 2020. During his career he had 150 receptions, 2,011 receiving yards, and nine touchdowns in 34 games. After his senior season in 2020, he entered the 2021 NFL Draft.

Professional career

On May 3, 2021, signed with the Jacksonville Jaguars as an undrafted free agent following the 2021 NFL Draft.

On August 27, 2021, Jones was waived by the Jaguars with an injury settlement. However, one month later, on September 27, 2021, he was signed to the Jaguars’ practice squad, where he would spend the season.

On January 10, 2022, Jones signed a reserve/future contract with the Jaguars.

On August 30, 2022, after the final roster cutdown of the preseason, Jones made the 53-man roster for the 2022 season.

References

External links
Jacksonville Jaguars bio
Southern Mississippi Golden Eagles bio

Living people
1998 births
Sportspeople from Biloxi, Mississippi
Players of American football from Mississippi
American football wide receivers
Biloxi High School alumni
Southern Miss Golden Eagles football players
Jacksonville Jaguars players